WGDQ (93.1 FM, "WGDQ") is a radio station licensed to serve the community of Sumrall, Mississippi, United States, and serving the Laurel-Hattiesburg area. The station broadcasts an urban gospel format. Its transmitter is located in Rawls Springs, Mississippi.

References

External links 

GDQ
Urban oldies radio stations in the United States